Carlos Torres Piña (born 1 March 1979) is a Mexican politician from the Party of the Democratic Revolution (MORENA). From 2009 to 2011 he served as Deputy of the LXI Legislature of the Mexican Congress representing Michoacán. From 2018 to 2021 LXIV Legislature of the Mexican Congress representing Michoacán.

References

1979 births
Living people
Politicians from Michoacán
Party of the Democratic Revolution politicians
21st-century Mexican politicians
Deputies of the LXI Legislature of Mexico
Members of the Chamber of Deputies (Mexico) for Michoacán